Ironwood High School is a public secondary school located in Glendale, Arizona, United States, part of the Peoria Unified School District. The school opened in August 1986 with its first graduating class in 1989. Since 2005, it has offered the IB Diploma Programme to its junior and senior year students, with a Pre-IB program for its freshman and sophomore-year students. It is the district's third-largest high school by enrollment.

Academics

IB Program 

In April 2005, Ironwood High School began to offer the International Baccalaureate Diploma Programme to juniors and seniors. Since 2005, the school has graduated over 100 full diploma members. Ironwood offers the standard five areas of English, History, Science (Physics and Biology), Foreign Language (French and Spanish), and Math, as well as numerous six area courses. The six area courses offered include Art, Computer Science, Economics, Music, Photo, Physics, and Theatre. The school also offers a two-year AIM program sponsored by the district in order to prepare pre-IB students. Ironwood offers the IB/AIM Club as a way to support IB and Pre-IB students.

Advanced Placement Program 

Ironwood offers numerous Advanced Placement courses. These include higher level computer science, history, math, and science.

Arts

Choir 
There are five choir groups at Ironwood:
Excelsis (formerly Chamber Singers)
Ironmen (formerly Men of Iron[wood])
Ea-gals (formerly Girls' Ensemble)
Mixed Choir
Concert Choir

Dance 
 Beginning Dance
 Advanced Dance
 Performance Dance
 Dance Club

Music 
Ironwood is home to three bands:
 Marching Band - Ironwood Marching Eagles
 Jazz Band
 Concert Band

Sports 

Fall
 Football (male)
 Cheerleading (male and female)
 Volleyball (female)
 Cross country (male and female)
 Swim and dive (male and female)
 Golf (male and female)
 Marching band - Ironwood Marching Eagles (male and female)

Winter
 Basketball (male and female)
 Wrestling (male and female)
 Soccer (male and female)
 Cheerleading (male and female)
 Drumline (male and female)

Spring
 Baseball (male)
 Softball (female)
 Track and field (male and female)
 Volleyball (male)
 Tennis (male and female)

Clubs and activities 
The following is a list of clubs offered at Ironwood High School as of the fall of 2011. Ironwood also formerly offered Hockey as a club.

 Anime Club
 Art Club
 Asian Cultural Awareness Club (ACA)
 Auto Club
 BMAS
 Bowling Club
 Chess Club
 Choir Club
 Christian Club on Campus (CCC)
 Clay Club
 Close Up
 Creative Writing (Aerie magazine)
 Dance
 Distributive Education Clubs of America (DECA)
 Drama Club
 Eagals (Choir Group)
 Fellowship of Christian Athletes (FCA)
 Family, Career and Community Leaders of America (FCCLA)
 Film Club
 Fishing Club
 Free Thinkers' Club
 French Honor Society
 Future Business Leaders of America (FBLA)
 Future Educators of America (FEA)
 Gay-Straight Alliance
 Guitar Club
 Health Occupations Students of America (HOSA)
 IB-AIM Club
 Ironmen (Choir Group)
 Key Club
 Movimiento Estudiantil Chicano de Aztlán (MECHA)
 Med Start
 Media Club (part of Skills USA)
 Multicultural Club
 National Honor Society
 Newspaper (Eagle's Eye)
 Photo Club
 Project Respect
 Science and Environmental Awareness Club (SEA Club)
 SkillsUSA
 Spanish Honor Society
 Speech and Debate
 Student Council
 Teens in Prevention (TIP)
 Weightlifting
 Wrestlerettes
 Yearbook

Feeder schools 
The following are K-8 schools that feed into Ironwood:
 Copperwood
 Desert Palms
 Desert Valley
 Heritage
 Marshall Ranch
 Sahuaro Ranch

Notable alumni 
 Josh Hawkins - Professional Skateboarer (Class of 2005)
 Noah Beck - social media personality (Class of 2019)
 Danny Cruz - soccer player, San Francisco Deltas (Class of 2007)
 Mackenzie Dern - six-time World Jiu-Jitsu Champion (Brazil), current Mixed Martial Artist (Class of 2011)
 Paul Ernster - National Football League punter (Class of 2000)
 Eric Hagg - National Football League safety (Nebraska) (Class of 2007)
Joshua Sweeney - Paralympic gold medalist (Class of 2005)

References

External links 
 Ironwood on Facebook
 Ironwood on Twitter
 Ironwood High School website
 Ironwood High School IB Program website
 School profile at greatschools.net

Educational institutions established in 1986
Public high schools in Arizona
Education in Glendale, Arizona
International Baccalaureate schools in Arizona
Schools in Maricopa County, Arizona
1986 establishments in Arizona